Johann Fauveau (born March 15, 1982) is a French Muay Thai kickboxer. He is a three time French Muaythai Champion. In May 2012, he became World Champion ISKA of Kickboxing K1.

Early life
Johann Fauveau is Jewish. His nickname "Young Perez" is reference to Victor Perez, a Jewish French Tunisian World Champion boxer, killed in the Holocaust. Fauveau's grandfather, who was friend with Perez and a boxing fan, got him into martial arts at an early age and he began training in karate initially before switching to boxing and Muay Thai.

Biography and career

Biography 
Johann was born in 1982 in Asnières.

Early career 

He is three times French Muaythai Champion. It counts 25 fights for 22 wins (including 15 by knockout), 2 defeats and 1 draw in Muaythai. He fought also in boxing, 4 fights for 3 wins (including 2 by knockout) and 1 draw.

In May 2012, he faced the English kickboxer Jordan Watson for the World title ISKA Kickboxing K1 Welterweight (- 70 kg), he won and became World Champion of Kickboxing K1 ISKA.

In January 2013, he faced the French kickboxer Ludovic Millet for the ISKA World Super Welterweight (-72.3 kg/159.4 lb) Oriental Championship in Meaux, France, losing on points.

He was set to go up against Warren Stevelmans at Glory 5: London on March 23, 2013, in London, England. However, when Andy Ristie was unable to fight in the event's co-main event against Albert Kraus, Stevelmans took his place and Costel Pașniciuc was drafted in as Fauveau's new opponent on one day's notice. Fauveau won by unanimous decision.

After this, he had a difficult development of career. 
He was stopped with low kicks in round three by Hinata at Glory 10: Los Angeles - Middleweight World Championship Tournament in Ontario, California, United States on September 28, 2013.

He was knocked out by Sitthichai Sitsongpeenong in round two at Best of Siam 5 in Paris, France, on June 14, 2014.

He came back after two years of break, with a new style of boxing with more footwork, much more dynamic, unpredictable and fluid. 
He won against Michael Françoise for the Triumph Fighting Tour.

Titles and achievements

 2012 ISKA World K-1 Rules Super Welterweight Champion (70 kg)
 2006 French Muaythai Class A Champion (69.800 kg)
 2005 French Muaythai Class A Champion 
 2004 French Muaythai Class A Champion

Kickboxing record

|-
|- style="background:#CCFFCC"
| 2017-06-23 || Win ||align=left| Michael Françoise || Triumph Fighting Tour || Paris, France || Decision (Unanimous) || 3 || 3:00
|-
|- style="background:#FFBBBB"
| 2014-06-14 || Loss ||align=left| Sitthichai Sitsongpeenong || Best of Siam 5 || Paris, France || KO || 2 || 
|-
|- style="background:#FFBBBB"
| 2013-12-14 || Loss ||align=left| Abdallah Mabel || Victory || Paris, France || Decision (unanimous) || 3 || 3:00
|-
|- style="background:#FFBBBB"
| 2013-09-28 || Loss ||align=left| Hinata Watanabe || Glory 10: Los Angeles || Ontario, California, USA || TKO (low kicks) || 3 || 0:48
|-
|-  bgcolor="#CCFFCC"
| 2013-03-23 || Win ||align=left| Costel Pașniciuc || Glory 5: London || London, England || Decision (Unanimous) || 3 || 3:00 
|-
|- style="background:#FFBBBB"
| 2013-01-19 || Loss ||align=left| Ludovic Millet || || Meaux, France || Decision || 5 || 3:00
|-
! style=background:white colspan=9 |
|-
|-  bgcolor="#CCFFCC"
| 2012-05-19 || Win ||align=left| Jordan Watson || Urban Boxing United || Marseilles, France || Decision || 5 || 3:00
|-
! style=background:white colspan=9 |
|-
|-  bgcolor="#CCFFCC"
| 2012-04-07 || Win ||align=left| Yazid Boussaha || Explosion Fight Night Volume 5 || Châteauroux, France || Decision || 3 || 3:00
|-
|-  bgcolor="#CCFFCC"
| 2011-11-19 || Win ||align=left| Fares Bechar || Time Fight || Tours, France || Decision || 3 || 3:00
|-
|-  style="background:#CCFFCC"
| 2011-10-01 || Win ||align=left| Aydin Tuncay || F-1 World MAX 2011 || Meyreuil, France || TKO (Referee Stoppage) || 3 || 
|-
|-  style="background:#CCFFCC"
| 2011-05-14 || Win ||align=left| Mickael Piscitello || It's Showtime 2011 Lyon || Lyon, France || TKO (Doctor Stoppage) || 5 || 
|-
|-  style="background:#CCFFCC"
| 2009-11-28 || Win ||align=left| Mickael Piscitello || A1 Lyon || Lyon, France || Decision || 5 || 3:00
|-
|-  style="background:#FFBBBB"
| 2009-06-20 || Loss ||align=left| Farid Villaume || Gala de Levallois || Levallois-Perret, France || Decision || 5 || 3:00 
|-
|-  style="background:#CCFFCC"
| 2008-11-06 || Win ||align=left| Willy Borrel || Gala de Levallois || Levallois, France || Decision || 5 || 3:00
|-
|-  style="background:#CCFFCC"
| 2008-06-12 || Win ||align=left| Kapapeth || Gala de Levallois || Levallois, France || Decision || 5 || 3:00
|-
|-  bgcolor="#c5d2ea"
| 2008-04-26 || Draw ||align=left| Djime Coulibaly || Gala in Saint-Denis || Saint-Denis, France || Decision Draw || 5 || 3:00
|-
|-  style="background:#FFBBBB"
| 2007-11-29 || Loss ||align=left| Willy Borrel || France vs Thailand || Coubertin-Paris, France || Decision || 5 || 3:00 
|-
|-  style="background:#CCFFCC"
| 2007-06-16 || Win ||align=left| Rachid Kabbouri || La Nuit des Super Fights VIII || Paris-Bercy, France || Decision || 5 || 3:00
|-
|-  style="background:#CCFFCC"
| 2007-04-21 || Win ||align=left| Steeve Valente || Gala de Levallois-Perret || Levallois, France || TKO (Gave Up) || 2 || 
|-
|-  style="background:#CCFFCC"
| 2006-11-18 || Win ||align=left| Djime Coulibaly || Gala in Levallois || Levallois, France || Decision || 5 || 2:00
|-
|-  style="background:#CCFFCC"
| 2006-11-04 || Win ||align=left| Tavares || French Championships 2006, Final || Saint-Denis, France || TKO (Referee stoppage) ||  || 
|-
! style=background:white colspan=9 |
|-
|-  style="background:#CCFFCC"
| 2006-07-01 || Win ||align=left|  || French Championships 2006, Semi Final || Saint-Denis, France || KO || 3 || 
|-
|-  style="background:#CCFFCC"
| 2006-02-04 || Win ||align=left| Mourad Bourrachid || Gala in Nantes || Nantes, France || KO || 4 || 
|-
|-  style="background:#CCFFCC"
| 2004-05-29 || Win ||align=left| Samuel Botereau || Gala in Asnières || Asnières, France || KO || 3 || 
|-
|-  style="background:#CCFFCC"
| 2004-03-27 || Win ||align=left| Rédouane || French Championships 2004, Semi Final || Val-de-Reuil, France || Decision || 4 || 3:00
|-

|-  bgcolor="#CCFFCC"
| 2011-01-22 || Win ||align=left| Zahari Mutafchiev || Palais des sports Marcel Cerdan || Levallois-Perret, France || Decision (Unanimous) || 6 || || 3–0-1
|-  bgcolor="#c5d2ea"
| 2010-11-20 || Draw ||align=left| Youssouf Doumbia || Palais des sports Marcel Cerdan || Levallois-Perret, France || Decision Draw || 6 || || 2–0-1
|-  bgcolor="#CCFFCC"
| 2010-06-25 || Win ||align=left| Fatah Hou || Palais des sports Marcel Cerdan || Levallois-Perret, France || TKO || 4 || || 2–0-0
|-  bgcolor="#CCFFCC"
| 2010-04-09 || Win ||align=left| Rudy Sibilo || Challenge Marcel Cerdan || Levallois-Perret, France || KO || 3 || || 1–0-0
|-
| colspan=9 | Legend:

See also 
List of male kickboxers

References

External links
Johann Fauveau Official Website

1984 births
Living people
French male kickboxers
French Muay Thai practitioners
21st-century French Jews
Jewish martial artists